The Harley-Davidson Model 1 was the first motorcycle produced by the American manufacturer Harley-Davidson. The purchase price was 200 US dollars; 38 copies were made.

History 
William S. Harley and Arthur Davidson developed the first prototype of a Harley Davidson motorcycle in 1903. The engine was designed according to the system De Dion-Bouton, had a displacement of 167 cc and made about 2 ps (1.5 kw). Since Harley and Davidson were dissatisfied with the performance, in 1904, cubic capacity was increased to 405 cm³ at one of bore 76 mm and one stroke 89 mm. From this pre-production model came two copies.

See also

List of Harley-Davidson motorcycles
List of motorcycles of 1900 to 1909
Serial 1

References

External links

1
Motorcycles introduced in the 1900s
Single-cylinder motorcycles